Nicky Melvin Singh (born 13 June 2002) is a Singaporean footballer currently playing as a midfielder for Albirex Niigata Singapore.

Club career 
Nicky begun his professional footballing career by signing for the Singapore Premier League side Albirex Niigata (S) on 22 January 2021.

On 13 March 2021, Nicky made his first-ever professional debut with Albirex Niigata (S) against Hougang United by starting the game and played for 75 minutes. He was replaced by Takahashi Mahiro in the 75th minute.

On 15 May 2021, Nicky scored his first-ever professional goal against the Young Lions in the 2021 Singapore Premier League. The match ended as Albirex Niigata (S) beating Young Lions in a result of 2–1 win.

Career statistics

Club

Notes

Honours 

Albirex Niigata Singapore
 Singapore Premier League runner-up: 2021
Singapore Premier League: 2022

References

2002 births
Living people
Singaporean footballers
Association football midfielders
Singapore Premier League players
Tampines Rovers FC players
Albirex Niigata Singapore FC players
Competitors at the 2021 Southeast Asian Games
Southeast Asian Games competitors for Singapore